Kingdom Come is a 2006 novel by the British writer J. G. Ballard. It is the last novel written by him before his 2009 death. The book deals with the supposed blurry line between consumerism and fascism. It also deals with the suburban environment and the psychogeography of such places.

References

External links
Kingdom Come synopsis on The Ballardian
The Guardian review
Rick McGrath review

2006 British novels
British crime novels
Fourth Estate books
Novels about consumerism
Novels by J. G. Ballard